Magdalena Rzeczkowska (born 22 April 1974) is a Polish politician who has been serving as Minister of Finance under Prime Minister Mateusz Morawiecki in his second cabinet since .

Early life and education 

She graduated from the faculty of law and administration at the University of Warsaw in 1998, and also completed postgraduate studies in European integration at the university's Centre for Europe in 2001.

Career 

She began working for the Ministry of Finance in 2002, eventually taking on a number of positions, including that of head of the customs department.

She was involved in Poland's accession to the European Union, and was a drafter of the Customs Law Act.  She was also responsible for modernizing the customs service so that all customs declarations could be processed electronically.  In addition, she reformed the customs clearance process and implemented an electronic toll collection system.  She was awarded a badge of merit for her contributions to the customs service.

She succeeded Tadeusz Kościński, who had resigned due to issues with a new tax system.

During the European Union's efforts to implement a plan to set a global minimum corporate tax rate of 15 per cent, Poland was the only holdout, with Rzeczkowska voicing her concern that if the tax reallocation pillar of the plan failed, the global minimum tax itself could cause a decline of revenues in the country.

Personal life 

Magdalena Rzeczkowska is married and has three sons.

Notes

References

External links 
 Ministerial profile on gov.pl

1974 births
Living people
21st-century Polish women politicians
Finance Ministers of Poland
Politicians from Warsaw
University of Warsaw alumni
Women government ministers of Poland